The Molendinar Burn is a burn in Glasgow, Scotland. It was the site of the settlement, Mellingdenor, that grew to become the kernel of Glasgow, and where St Mungo founded his church in the 6th century. It was later used to power the growing town's mills and the name became adapted because the word "molendinar" means "relating to a mill or millers", possibly because that is what the Welsh name Mellingdenor originally meant.

Historic Course (late 1700s) 
Richard Thomas' 1795 "Map of the town of Glasgow & country seven miles around" clearly shows the course of the burn. The source at that time was a small loch at "Huggenfield" to the north east of the city (the present day Hogganfield Loch). The course then headed generally south west, passing through the virtually undeveloped areas of Craighead, Blackhill and Blochairn, where it passed under the Monkland Canal. Approaching the city, the course turned south past "Kirk" and down the route of the present day Wishart Street, passing under what are now Duke Street and Gallowgate to pass in front of St Andrew's Church. Saltmarket south of Bridgegate did not exist at that time, the burn ran through fields there to enter the Clyde at the present day Clyde Street at Mart Street. Peter Fleming's 1807 "Map of the City of Glasgow and suburbs" shows the city centre area of the burn in greater detail. It can be seen from both of these maps that the burn ran almost entirely above ground at that time.

Present Course (2020) 
The present source of the burn is Frankfield Loch in Cardowan. This loch did not exist (or was not mapped) when Thomas published his 1795 map. A short man-made cut connects Frankfield Loch to the  distant Hogganfield Loch. The route from Hogganfield Loch to the River Clyde is fairly similar to that of 1795. However the majority of the length of the burn has been culverted in stages since the 1870s. Short stretches of the burn can be seen above ground in Molendinar Park (in the Blackhill / Provanmill area) and beside the former Great Eastern Hotel on Duke Street.

The final  stretch from Greendyke to the Clyde was rerouted at some time in the past.

Molendinar Burn Photo Gallery

References

External links
picture on Flickr

Rivers of Glasgow
Subterranean rivers of the United Kingdom